Marsone  may refer to:

 Pierre Marsone (born 1966), French sinologist
 Mars One, one-way crewed mission to Mars project

See also 
 Mars 1 (disambiguation)
 Marson (disambiguation)